Hawkes is a surname. Notable people with the surname include:

 Albert W. Hawkes (1878–1971), Senator from New Jersey
 Aristazabal Hawkes, member of the band, Guillemots
 Brady Hawkes, fictional character played by Kenny Rogers in The Gambler, TV movie series
 Brent Hawkes (1950), Canadian clergyman and gay rights activist
 Christopher Hawkes (1905–1992), English archaeologist
 Chesney Hawkes (1971), English musician and actor
 David Hawkes (disambiguation), multiple people including:
 David Hawkes (scholar) (1923–2009), British sinologist
 George Wright Hawkes (1821–1908), lay Anglican churchman in Adelaide, South Australia
 Graham Hawkes (1947), submarine engineer and entrepreneur
 Greg Hawkes (1952), keyboardist for The Cars
 Howard Hawkes (1894–1970), American football coach
 J. H. M. Hawkes (1851–1944), businessman of Adelaide, South Australia
 Jacquetta Hawkes (1910–1996), British archaeologist
 James S. Hawkes (1856–1919), Australian accountant and civil engineer
 Jane Hawkes, Art Historian
 Jeff Hawkes (1953), South African professional golfer
 Jim Hawkes (1934–2019), Canadian MP
 John Hawkes (disambiguation), several names including
 John Hawkes (actor), born John Marvin Perkins in 1959, US actor
 Kristen Hawkes, American anthropologist
 Leonard Hawkes (1891–1981), British geologist
 Michael Hawkes (1977), American football player
 Rechelle Hawkes (1967), Australian hockey player
 Sheldon Hawkes, fictional character played by Hill Harper in CSI: NY, television series
 Sonia Chadwick Hawkes (1933–1999), British archaeologist
 Terri Hawkes (1958), Canadian actor
 Robert Hawkes (1880–1945), College Professor

See also
 Hawke's Bay, New Zealand
 Hawkes Harbor, novel
 Hawks
 Hawke (disambiguation)

English-language surnames